Axiocteta is a genus of moths of the family Noctuidae. The genus was described by Turner in 1902.

Species
 Axiocteta babooni Bethune-Baker, 1906
 Axiocteta concolora Bethune-Baker, 1906
 Axiocteta encampina Hampson, 1926
 Axiocteta flava Bethune-Baker, 1906
 Axiocteta metaleuca Hampson, 1926
 Axiocteta obliqua Bethune-Baker, 1906
 Axiocteta oenoplex Turner, 1902
 Axiocteta rufa Bethune-Baker, 1906
 Axiocteta subuniformis Rothschild, 1915
 Axiocteta turneri Bethune-Baker, 1906

References

Catocalinae